Farris is a surname. Notable people with the name include:

 Amy Farris (1968–2009), American fiddler
 Barbara Farris (born 1976), American basketball player
 Chase Farris (born 1993), American football player
 Christine King Farris (born 1927), American educator and civil rights activist
 Darren Farris (born 1972), American singer-songwriter
 Dionne Farris (born 1968), American singer
 Eric Farris (born 1986), American baseball player
 Hazel Farris (c. 1880–1906), American alleged murderer
 Ion Farris (1878–1934), American politician
 Isaac Newton Farris, Jr., American civil rights leader
 Jack K. Farris (1934–2019), American general
 James Farris (died 1995), American murder victim
 Jimmy Farris (born 1978), American football player
 John Farris (born 1936), American writer
 John Lauchlan Farris (1911–1986), Canadian lawyer and judge
 John Wallace de Beque Farris (1878–1970), Canadian politician
 Joseph Jerome Farris (1930–2020), American judge
 Joshua Farris (born 1995), American figure skater
 Katie Farris, American writer
 Kendrick Farris (born 1986), American weightlifter
 Kris Farris (born 1977), American football player
 Laughlin Farris (1843–1925), Canadian politician
 Leona Farris (1917–2022), American educator
 Lindsay Farris (born 1985), Australian actor
 Mark Farris (born 1975), American football and baseball player
 Maude Farris-Luse (1887–2002), American supercentenarian
 Meg Farris (born 1958), American journalist
 Michael Farris (lawyer) (born 1951), American lawyer
 Mike Farris (musician) (born ca. 1968), American musician
 Ralph Farris (born 1970), American violist
 Suzanne Farris (murder victim) (died 1966), American murder victim
 Tom Farris (1920–2002), American football player
 Vera King Farris (1938–2009), American college administrator
 Victor Farris, American inventor

See also
 Faris (name), given name and surname
 Three Australian musicians named Farriss, all brothers and former members of INXS:
 Tim Farriss (born 1957)
 Andrew Farriss (born 1959)
 Jon Farriss (born 1961)
 Farrish
 Ferris (name), given name and surname